Krümmel is an Ortsgemeinde – a community belonging to a Verbandsgemeinde – in the Westerwaldkreis in Rhineland-Palatinate, Germany. The community belongs to the Verbandsgemeinde of Selters, a kind of collective municipality.

Geography

The rural residential community of Krümmel lies 2 km west of Selters in woodland and meadowland.

History
In 1022, Krümmel had its first documentary mention as Crumbele. In 1972, in the course of municipal restructuring, the Verbandsgemeinde of Selters was founded, to which Krümmel belongs.

Politics

The municipal council is made up of 8 council members, including the honorary and presiding mayor (Ortsbürgermeister), who were elected in a majority vote in a municipal election on 13 June 2004.

Economy and infrastructure

North of the community runs the Bundesstraße 413, leading from Bendorf to Hachenburg. The nearest Autobahn interchange is Dierdorf on the A 3 (Cologne–Frankfurt). The nearest InterCityExpress stop is the railway station at Montabaur on the Cologne-Frankfurt high-speed rail line.

References

External links
Krümmel 
Verbandsgemeinde Selters (Westerwald) 

Municipalities in Rhineland-Palatinate
Westerwaldkreis